Phil Pardee (January 9, 1906 Los Angeles, California – December 27, 1967 Madison, Montana) was an American racecar driver.

Indy 500 results

References

1906 births
1967 deaths
American racing drivers
Indianapolis 500 drivers
Racing drivers from Los Angeles